Meghnath is a filmmaker and activist working in Jharkhand for the last 40 years. He has been with the people’s struggle against destructive development. As a filmmaker, he has tried to document the voice of those sections of people who remain unheard. Meghnath was awarded the prestigious 59th National Film Awards and 65th National Film Awards.

Introduction
Meghnath was born on 29 June 1953 in Bombay of Bombay State (now Mumbai of Maharashtra). He did his schooling in Bombay and started social work from 1971 in the refugee camps of Bangladesh Liberation War. He started rural development work in National Service Scheme (NSS) under the guidance of Fr Gerard Beckers and worked as a volunteer for students health home, a co-operative health movement of the students with 3 lakhs members. He was elected the Joint Secretary of Health Home for the year 1975 to 1977. Meghnath completed his graduation from St. Xavier's College, Kolkata in 1977 and was the organizer of the highest voluntary Blood Donor in 1977 and 1978. He did his diploma in Social Work from Indian Social Institute, Bangalore in 1980 and came to Palamu district in 1981 to work on the issue of bonded labour in Jharkhand and eventually participated in the peoples struggle of to save the land, water and forest. He was the part of Jharkhand Movement and was the founder member of Jharkhand Coordination Committee (JCC) along with B. P. Keshri, Sanjay Basu Mallick, N. E. Horo, Bishop Nirmal Minj and others. He did a short course on film making from  Notredem Communication Centre Patna in 1988 and from CENDIT, New Delhi in 1989. In 1990, he did Film Appreciation Course from FTII, Pune and National Film Archive of India and also became a part of National Alliance of People's Movements (NAPM) and was part of Narmada Bachao Andolan along with Medha Patkar and participated in fasting for 22 days in the banks of Narmada. He has also worked with reputed documentary filmmaker Tapan Bose and Suhasini Mulay in 1989-91 and he started discussion and debate on the pro-people development models in predominately Adivasi Area and was the founder member of Pani Chetna Manch along with members of People's Science Institute. He worked on an alternative irrigation model and was part of making 125 small check dams (Ahar) and pines in Palamu district in 1993-95 under Sukha Mukti Abhiyan.

In 1993, he formed the group AKHRA to work in the field of culture and communication along with others. He was the Guest Faculty of Mass Communication and Journalism department in St. Xavier's College, Ranchi.  In the last 40 years of social and cultural work, he has had the opportunity to work and learn from many great people and to name a few they are Fr Gerard Beckers, Debabrata Roy, Mother Teresa, Pannalal Das Gupta, Bishop George Sopien, B. P. Keshri, Tapan Bose, Suhasini Mulay, Satish Bahadur, P. K. Nair, Baba Amte, Sunderlal Bahuguna, Medha Patkar and Ram Dayal Munda. He considers film making as the extension of his social and cultural work. Along with Biju Toppo he has worked in more than 15 films which have received national and international recognition.

Filmography

Film awards

References

Living people
1953 births